Amai may refer to:

AMAI, Mexican marketing research standards agency
Willa Amai, American folk musician
Ao Amai, a character from A Certain Magical Index franchise

See also